Ron Katz (born 4 October 1985) is an Israeli lawyer and politician. He is currently a member of the Knesset for Yesh Atid.

Biography
During his national service in the Israeli Defence Forces, Katz served in the Military Advocate General. He later worked as a civilian lawyer, specialising in family law and wills.

After joining Yesh Atid, Katz became a party activist in Petah Tikva, where he served as deputy mayor. Prior to the 2021 Knesset elections he was placed sixteenth on the Yesh Atid list, and was elected to the Knesset as the party won seventeen seats.

References

External links

1985 births
Living people
21st-century Israeli lawyers
Deputy mayors of places in Israel
Israeli Jews
Jewish Israeli politicians
Members of the 24th Knesset (2021–2022)
Members of the 25th Knesset (2022–)
People from Petah Tikva
Yesh Atid politicians